Wilbur David Cook (June 19, 1869 – February 27, 1938), or Wilbur D. Cook Jr., was an American landscape architect and urban planner from Atlanta. He designed the master plans for the city of Beverly Hills, California, and the city of Highland Park in Dallas, Texas.

Career

Overview
According to a report by the Environmental Planning Branch of Caltrans,

Projects
With the Olmstead firm, Cook had worked on Palos Verdes Estates, and the Panama–California Exposition in Balboa Park, San Diego, California.

His other work included Exposition Park in Los Angeles,  and other city parks in Monrovia, Anaheim, and Fullerton, California.

Cook also designed the original grounds of the Beverly Hills Hotel, with Elmer Grey as the architect.

With George Duffield Hall (1877–1961), Cook formed the firm Cook & Hall, Landscape Architects and City Planners. When Ralph D. Cornell (1890–1972) joined it became Cook, Hall & Cornell (1924–1933).

References

External links

American landscape and garden designers
American urban planners
American landscape architects
People from Los Angeles
People from Oakland, California
Architects from San Francisco
People from Beverly Hills, California
Balboa Park (San Diego)
Place of death missing
1869 births
American designers
1938 deaths